The Anthea Group is a private group of companies engaged in the manufacture and export of a range of speciality chemicals based in Mumbai, India. The Group is a major producer of Fragrance & Flavour chemicals, catering to key F&F multinationals. It markets its goods in North and South America, Europe and the Asia-Pacific region. Additionally, the Anthea Group produces speciality chemicals which are used in a range of applications such as pharmaceuticals, flame retardant polymers and agrochemicals.

History
The Anthea Group has its origins in 1991 with the establishment of Anthea Aromatics Pvt. Ltd. (AAPL), a company that was set up in Navi Mumbai to manufacture speciality chemicals used in the perfumery and flavour industry. In 2002, a new manufacturing facility was set up in Roha, Maharashtra to manufacture a key perfumery intermediate. In 2007, AAPL entered into a 50:50 joint venture with les Dérivés Résiniques et Terpéniques (DRT), a reputed French multinational engaged in the research, development and manufacture of resin and terpene derivatives. In 2008, The Anthea Group took over Crown Chemicals Pvt. Ltd. located at Tarapur MIDC, and revamped this facility to manufacture synthetic Piperonal (Heliotropin) through a novel and eco-friendly route. In 2011, DRT took a substantial stake in Crown Chemicals. Subsequently, DRT increased its stake in Crown Chemicals, which is now a 50:50 JV between DRT and The Anthea Group. In 2016, ICICI Ventures, the private equity arm of ICICI Bank, is investing about Rs 120 crore for a minority stake in the Anthea Group. The Anthea Group is one of the most profitable in India with revenues of over Rs 350 crore (US$53 million) in 2015 – 16.

The Anthea Group consists of four companies. Anthea Aromatics was founded by Vincent Paul, who is a former head of organic chemistry at Hindustan Lever Ltd.

Manufacturing facilities
The Anthea Group includes the following companies, spread across 4 locations.

  Anthea Aromatics Pvt. Ltd., Rabale, Navi Mumbai, Maharashtra.
  DRT-Anthea Aroma Chemicals Pvt. Ltd. (2 manufacturing units) Roha, Raigad, Maharashtra. A third unit is coming up in Roha, which is expected to be operational by Mar 2017.
  Crown Chemicals Pvt. Ltd., Tarapur, Maharashtra.
  Catàsynth Speciality Chemicals Pvt. Ltd., established in 2016 and coming up in Mangalore SEZ, Karnataka.

Research

The Research and Development Center of the Anthea Group is located in Rabale, Navi Mumbai. The Anthea Group claims special focus on green chemistry and eco-friendly processes. The R&D lab has been certified by the Department of Scientific and Industrial Research (India) since 2004.

Development of Synthetic Heliotropin (Piperonal) 
Heliotropin (also known as Piperonal), an extract of the Sassafras tree, is used in the manufacture of perfumes, soaps and body lotions. Natural Heliotropin is obtained from Sassafras oil which is extracted from the roots of the Sassafras tree, a species of deciduous trees in the family Lauraceae. The massive commercial felling of Sassafras forests has led to the danger of extinction of the species. It is estimated that around 5 million trees are cut down every year to meet the worldwide demand for Heliotropin.
The Anthea Group through its in-house research developed a synthetic grade of Heliotropin having a high purity, and has set up manufacturing facilities in Group company, Crown Chemicals. Synthetic Piperonal manufactured in Crown Chemicals is widely used in Fragrance, Flavour and Pharmaceutical applications.

The US Food and Drug Administration has found synthetic Piperonal to be safe for human consumption.

Timeline of Strategic Initiatives / Investments

1992: Commences manufacturing of F&F chemicals in Rabale, Navi Mumbai.
2002: Establishes manufacturing facility in Roha.
2007: Enters into a strategic tie-up with French multinational DRT (les Dérivés Résiniques et Terpéniques).
2007: Acquires Crown Chemicals in Tarapur. 
2008: Establishes DRT-Anthea as a 50:50 JV with DRT. DRT-Anthea sets up new facility in Roha.
2009: Starts manufacturing synthetic Piperonal in Crown Chemicals. Obtains quality approvals from global F&F multinationals. 
2011: DRT acquires a significant shareholding in Crown Chemicals, which has since been increased to 50%.
2011: DRT-Anthea purchases a 23,000 sq. m. plot in Roha for future expansion. 
2014: Capacity expansion completed in Crown Chemicals.
2016: Group company Catàsynth Speciality Chemicals is formed.
2016: ICICI Ventures picks up minority stake in Anthea Aromatics for Rs 120 crore.
2017: Capacity expansion completed in DRT-Anthea Aroma Chemicals.

References

External links
 

Manufacturing companies based in Mumbai
Chemical companies of India
Chemical companies established in 1991
Indian companies established in 1991
1991 establishments in Maharashtra